Max Jeffers (14 November 1929 – 29 January 1988) was an Australian rules footballer who played with Melbourne in the Victorian Football League (VFL).

Notes

External links 		

		
		
		

1929 births
1988 deaths
Australian rules footballers from New South Wales
Melbourne Football Club players